Guge was an ancient dynastic kingdom in Western Tibet. The kingdom was centered in present-day Zanda County, Ngari Prefecture, Tibet Autonomous Region. At various points in history after the 10th century AD, the kingdom held sway over a vast area including south-eastern Zanskar, upper Kinnaur district, and Spiti Valley, either by conquest or as tributaries.

History

Founding 
Guge was founded in the 10th century.  Its capitals were located at Tholing  and Tsaparang.  Kyide Nyimagon, a great-grandson of Langdarma, the last monarch of the Tibetan Empire, fled to Ngari (West Tibet) from the insecure conditions in Ü-Tsang in 910. He established a kingdom around 912, annexing Purang and Guge. He established his capital in Guge.

Nyimagon later divided his lands into three parts. The king's eldest son Palgyigon became ruler of Maryul (Ladakh), his second son Trashigon (bKra shis mgon) received Guge-Purang, and the third son Detsukgon received Zanskar.

Second diffusion of Buddhism 

Trashigon was succeeded by his son Srong nge or Yeshe-Ö (Ye shes 'Od) (947–1024 or (959–1036), who was a renowned Buddhist figure. In his time a Tibetan lotsawa from Guge called Rinchen Zangpo (958–1055), after having studied in India, returned to his homeland as a monk to promote Buddhism. Together with the zeal of Yeshe-Ö, this marked the beginning of a new diffusion of Buddhist teachings in western Tibet. In 988 Yeshe-Ö took religious vows and left kingship to his younger brother Khor re.

According to later historiography, the Turkic Karluks (Gar log) took the Yeshe-Ö prisoner in a war. The episode has a prominent place in Tibetan history writing. The Karluks offered to set him free if he renounced Buddhism, which he refused to do. They then demanded his weight in gold to release him. His junior kinsman Byang chub 'Od visited him in his prison with a small retinue, but Yeshe-Ö admonished him not to use the gold at hand for ransom, but rather to invite the renowned Mahayana sage Atiśa (982–1054). Yeshe-Ö eventually died in prison from age and poor treatment. The story is historically debated since it contains chronological inconsistencies.

Successions 

In 1037, Khor re's eldest grandson 'Od lde was killed in a conflict with the Kara-Khanid Khanate from Central Asia, who subsequently ravaged Ngari. His brother Byang chub 'Od (984–1078), a Buddhist monk, took power as secular ruler.  He was responsible for inviting Atiśa to Tibet in 1040 and thus ushering in the so-called Chidar (Phyi-dar) phase of Buddhism in Tibet. Byang chub 'Od's son rTse lde was murdered by his nephew in 1088. This event marked the break-up of the Guge-Purang kingdom, since one of his brothers was established as separate king of Purang. The usurping nephew dBang lde continued the royal dynasty in Guge.

A new Kara-Khanid invasion of Guge took place before 1137 and cost the life of the ruler, bKra shis rtse. Later in the same century the kingdom was temporarily divided. In 1240 the Mongol khagan, at least nominally, gave authority over the Ngari area to the Drigung Monastery in Ü-Tsang.

Grags pa lde was an important ruler who united the Guge area around 1265 and subjugated the related Ya rtse (Khasa) kingdom. After his death in 1277 Guge was dominated by the Sakya monastic regime. After 1363, with the decline of the Mongol-led Yuan dynasty and their Sakya protégés, Guge was again strengthened and took over Purang in 1378. Purang was henceforth contested between Guge and Mustang, but was finally integrated into the former. Guge also briefly ruled over Ladakh in the late 14th century. From 1499 the Guge king had to acknowledge the Rinpungpa rulers of Tsang. The 15th and 16th centuries were marked by a considerable Buddhist building activity by the kings, who frequently showed their devotion to the Gelug leaders later known as the Dalai Lamas.

Ladakhi invasions 

The first Westerners to reach Guge were António de Andrade, a Jesuit missionary, and his companion brother Manuel Marques, in 1624. De Andrade reported seeing irrigation canals and rich crops in what is now a dry and desolate land. Perhaps as evidence of the kingdom's openness, de Andrade's party was allowed to construct a chapel in Tsaparang and instruct the people about Christianity. A letter by De Andrade relates that some military commanders revolted and called the Ladakhis to overthrow the ruler. There had been friction between Guge and Ladakh for many years, and the invitation was heeded in 1630. The Ladakhi forces laid siege to the almost impenetrable Tsaparang. The King's brother, who was chief lama and thus a staunch Buddhist, advised the pro-Christian ruler to surrender against keeping the state as tributary ruler. This treacherous advice was eventually accepted. Tibetan sources suggest that the Guge population was maintained in their old status. The last king, Tashi Drakpa De, (Khri bKra shis Grags pa lde) and his brother and other kin, were deported to Ladakh, where they lived comfortably until their death. The prince married a wife from the Ladakhi royal family.

Annexation to Central Tibet 
Tsaparang and the Guge kingdom were later conquered in 1679–80 by the Lhasa-based Central Tibetan government under the leadership of the 5th Dalai Lama, driving out the Ladakhis.

Historiography 
Western archeologists heard about Guge again in the 1930s through the work of Italian Giuseppe Tucci. Tucci's work was mainly about the frescoes of Guge. Lama Anagarika Govinda and Li Gotami Govinda visited the kingdom of Guge, including Tholing and Tsaparang, in 1947–1949. Their tours of central and western Tibet are recorded in black-and-white photos.

Rulers 
A list of rulers of Guge and the related Ya rtse kingdom has been established by the Tibetologists Luciano Petech and Roberto Vitali

A. Royal ancestors of the Yarlung dynasty
 'Od srungs (in Central Tibet 842–905) son of Glang Darma
 dPal 'Khor btsan (in Central Tibet 905–910) son
 Kyide Nyimagon (in Ngari Korsum, c. 912–?) son
 Palgyigon (received Ladakh, 10th century) son
 Detsukgon (received Zanskar, 10th century) brother
B. Kings of Guge and Purang.
 Trashigon (received Guge and Purang, fl. 947) brother
 Yeshe-Ö (?–988 or 959–1036) son 
 Nagaraja (religious leader, d. 1023) son
 Devaraja (religious leader, d. 1026) brother
 Khor re (988–996) uncle
 Lha lde (996–1024) son
 'Od lde btsan (1024–1037) son
 Byang chub 'Od (1037–1057) brother
 Zhi ba 'Od (religious leader, d. 1111) brother
 Che chen tsha rTse lde (1057–1088) son of Byang chub 'od
C. Kings of Ya rtse.
 Naga lde (early 12th century)
 bTsan phyug lde (mid-12th century)
 bKra shis lde (12th century)
 Grags btsan lde (12th century) brother of bTsan phyug lde)
 Grags pa lde (Kradhicalla) (fl. 1225)
 A sog lde (Ashokacalla) (fl. 1255–1278) son
 'Ji dar sMal (Jitarimalla) (fl. 1287–1293) son
 A nan sMal (Anandamalla) (late 13th century) brother
 Ri'u sMal (Ripumalla) (fl. 1312–1214) son
 San gha sMal (Sangramamalla) (early 14th century) son
 Ajitamalla (1321–1328) son of Jitarimalla
 Kalyanamalla (14th century)
 Pratapamalla (14th century)
 Pu ni sMal (Punyamalla) (fl. 1336–1339) of Purang royalty
 sPri ti sMal (Prthivimalla) (fl. 1354–1358) son
D. Kings of Guge.

 Bar lde (dBang lde) (1088 – c. 1095) nephew of Che chen tsha rTse lde
 bSod nams rtse (c. 1095 – early 12th century) son
 bKra shis rtse (before 1137) son
 Jo bo rGyal po (regent, mid-12th century) brother
 rTse 'bar btsan (12th century) son of bKra shis rtse
 sPyi lde btsan (12th century) son
 rNam lde btsan (12th/13th century) son
 Nyi ma lde (12th/13th century) son
 dGe 'bum (13th century) probably an outsider
 La ga (died c. 1260) of foreign origin
 Chos rgyal Grags pa (c. 1260–1265)
 Grags pa lde (c. 1265–1277) prince from Lho stod
 unknown rulers
 rNam rgyal lde (c. 1396 – 1424) son of a Guge ruler
 Nam mkha'i dBang po Phun tshogs lde (1424–1449) son
 rNam ri Sang rgyas lde (1449–?) son
 bLo bzang Rab brtan (died c. 1485) son
 sTod tsha 'Phags pa lha (c. 1485 – after 1499) son
 Shakya 'od (early 16th century) son
 Jig rten dBang phyug Pad kar lde (fl. 1537–1555) son?
 Ngag gi dBang phyug (16th century) son
 Nam mkha dBang phyug (16th century) son
 Khri Nyi ma dBang phyug (late 16th century) son
 Khri Grags pa'i dBang phyug (c. 1600) son
 Khri Nam rgyal Grags pa lde (fl. 1618) son
 Tashi Drakpa De (before 1622–1630) son
 Kingdom conquered by Ladakh (1630)
 Kingdom later conquered by Tibet under the Fifth Dalai Lama (1679–1680)

See also
 Purang-Guge Kingdom
 Zhangzhung
 Tsaparang
 History of Tibet
 Ladakh Chronicles
 List of rulers of Tibet

References
Specific references:

General references:

 Allen, Charles. (1999) The Search for Shangri-La: A Journey into Tibetan History. Little, Brown and Company. Reprint: 2000 Abacus Books, London. .

Further reading
 Bellezza, John Vincent: Zhang Zhung. Foundations of Civilization in Tibet. A Historical and Ethnoarchaeological Study of the Monuments, Rock Art, Texts, and Oral Tradition of the Ancient Tibetan Upland. Denkschriften der phil.-hist. Klasse 368. Beitraege zur Kultur- und Geistesgeschichte Asiens 61, Verlag der Oesterreichischen Akademie der Wissenschaften, Wien 2008.
 
 
 
 
 
 
 van Ham, Peter. (2017). Guge--Ages of Gold: The West Tibetan Masterpieces. Hirmer Verlag, 390 pages,    
 Zeisler, Bettina. (2010). "East of the Moon and West of the Sun? Approaches to a Land with Many Names, North of Ancient India and South of Khotan." In: The Tibet Journal, Special issue. Autumn 2009 vol XXXIV n. 3-Summer 2010 vol XXXV n. 2. "The Earth Ox Papers", edited by Roberto Vitali, pp. 371–463.

External links
  "Submerged in the Cosmos" by David Shulman, The New York Review of Books, February 24, 2017, retrieved March 2, 2017.
 "Unravelling the mysteries of Guge" by Xiong Lei, China Daily, May 8, 2003, retrieved November 24, 2005

Former countries in Chinese history
History of Tibet
Archaeological sites in Himachal Pradesh
Archaeological sites in Tibet
Ngari Prefecture
History of Himachal Pradesh
Major National Historical and Cultural Sites in Tibet
Former kingdoms